Kalinowa may refer to the following places in Poland:
Kalinowa, Lower Silesian Voivodeship (south-west Poland)
Kalinowa, Kutno County in Łódź Voivodeship (central Poland)
Kalinowa, Sieradz County in Łódź Voivodeship (central Poland)
Kalinowa, Zduńska Wola County in Łódź Voivodeship (central Poland)
Kalinowa, Greater Poland Voivodeship (west-central Poland)